"Hair Too Long" is a song by British pop rock band The Vamps. The song was released as a digital download on 20 April 2018 through Sony Music Entertainment. It serves as the third single from their third studio album Night & Day, being included on the second part of it, called Day Edition.

Music video
A music video to accompany the release of "Hair Too Long" was first released onto YouTube on 20 April 2018 at a total length of three minutes and thirty-one seconds.

Track listing

Charts

Release history

References

 

 

2018 songs
2018 singles
The Vamps (British band) songs